SNC Demo-1, also known as Dream Chaser Demo-1, is the planned first flight of the Sierra Nevada robotic resupply spacecraft Dream Chaser to the International Space Station (ISS) under the CRS-2 contract with NASA. The demonstration mission is planned for launch in Summer 2023 on the second flight of the ULA Vulcan Centaur rocket. Sierra Nevada Corporation (SNC) developed a new reusable spacecraft to provide commercial cargo resupply services to the International Space Station (ISS), based on decades of lifting body programs. Under the Commercial Orbital Transportation System (COTS) program, SNC designed Dream Chaser with industrial partner Lockheed Martin. SNC also designed the accompanying Shooting Star cargo module with subcontractor Applied Composites. At the end of mission, the Shooting Star will destructively reenter the atmosphere and the Dream Chaser will land at the Kennedy Space Center's Shuttle Landing Facility.

Spacecraft 
The Dream Chaser Cargo System will fly cargo resupply missions to the ISS under NASA's Commercial Resupply Services-2 program. This system features the Shooting Star, an expendable cargo module with solar panels, and the Dream Chaser, a reusable lifting body capable of returning  of pressurized cargo to Earth while undergoing maximum re-entry forces of 1.5 g. 

The Dream Chaser design is derived from NASA's HL-20 Personnel Launch System spaceplane concept from the 1990s, which in turn is descended from over 20,000 hours and six decades of experimental lifting body vehicles, including the X-20 Dyna-Soar, Northrop M2-F2, Northrop M2-F3, Northrop HL-10, Martin X-24A and X-24B, and Martin X-23 PRIME. 

The vehicle to be used in SNC Demo-1 is named Tenacity. The Shooting Star carries pressurized and unpressurized cargo, and serves as the power supply for the Dream Chaser. Its design is similar to the Exoliner cargo container shown in Lockheed Martin's Jupiter proposal for NASA's CRS-2.

Mission 
SNC Demo-1 is the Dream Chaser demonstration mission under the Commercial Resupply Services-2 (CRS-2) contract with NASA. Production and integration of the Dream Chaser spacecraft is performed in Texas, Colorado, and Florida. The Dream Chaser is mated with the Shooting Star at the launch site, and mission operations are conducted from control centers in Colorado and Houston, Texas. Sierra Nevada selected ULA's Vulcan Centaur as its launch vehicle for this Demo-1 mission and the six contracted NASA CRS-2 missions.

See also 
 Cygnus Orb-D1
 SpaceX COTS Demo Flight 2

References

External links 
 Dream Chaser at Sierra Nevada Corporation

Sierra Nevada Corporation aircraft
Supply vehicles for the International Space Station
2023 in spaceflight
2023 in the United States
Test spaceflights